Accommodation of Crews Convention (Revised), 1949 is  an International Labour Organization Convention.

It was established in 1949, with the preamble stating:
Having decided upon the adoption of certain proposals with regard to the partial revision of the Accommodation of Crews Convention,...

Modification 

This Convention is a partial revision of Convention C75 - Accommodation of Crews Convention, 1946, which never came into effect.

Ratifications
As of 2022, 47 states have ratified the convention. Of the ratifying states, 32 have subsequently denounced the convention.

External links 
Text.
Ratifications.

International Labour Organization conventions
Treaties entered into force in 1953
Treaties concluded in 1949
Treaties of Algeria
Treaties of the People's Republic of Angola
Treaties of Azerbaijan
Treaties of Belgium
Treaties of Belize
Treaties of Bosnia and Herzegovina
Treaties of the Second Brazilian Republic
Treaties of Costa Rica
Treaties of Cuba
Treaties of Egypt
Treaties of Equatorial Guinea
Treaties of West Germany
Treaties of Ghana
Treaties of Guinea-Bissau
Treaties of Ba'athist Iraq
Treaties of Ireland
Treaties of Israel
Treaties of Italy
Treaties of Kyrgyzstan
Treaties of Moldova
Treaties of Montenegro
Treaties of New Zealand
Treaties of Panama
Treaties of the Estado Novo (Portugal)
Treaties of Romania
Treaties of Slovenia
Treaties of Tajikistan
Treaties of North Macedonia
Treaties of Turkey
Treaties of the Ukrainian Soviet Socialist Republic
Treaties of the United Kingdom
Treaties of Yugoslavia
Admiralty law treaties
Treaties extended to the Faroe Islands
Treaties extended to the Isle of Man
Treaties extended to French Guiana
Treaties extended to Martinique
Treaties extended to Guadeloupe
Treaties extended to Réunion
Treaties extended to British Hong Kong
1949 in labor relations